Romuald Adam Cebertowicz (February 7, 1897 in Głowno – January 14, 1981 in Łódź, Poland) was a Polish hydrotechnician and a member of the Polish Academy of Sciences (PAN).

Cebertowicz is the creator of electro-injection method of soil solidification.

1897 births
1981 deaths
Polish hydrotechnicians